The 2020 Danish Cup final was be played on 1 July 2020 between SønderjyskE and AaB at Blue Water Arena, Esbjerg, a neutral ground.   The final was the culmination of the 2019–20 Danish Cup, the 66th season of the Sydbank Pokalen.  Originally scheduled to be played in May, the final was delayed due to the COVID-19 shutdown through Europe.

SønderjyskE won its first major championship of any kind in its 13-year history, beating AaB 2–0.  It was SønderjyskE's first ever appearance in the Danish Cup final.  AaB appeared in its 12th Pokalen final, having previously won the cup in 1966, 1970 and 2014, finishing as runners-up for the 9th time, adding 2020 to its second-place runs in 1967, 1987, 1991, 1993, 1999, 2000, 2004 and 2009. 

By virtue of its victory, SønderjyskE earns a place in at least the second qualifying round of the 2020–21 UEFA Europa League.

Teams

Venue
In just third time in cup history, the final was played in a venue other than the Copenhagen Sports Park (1955–1990), or Parken Stadium (1993–2019).  Blue Water Arena in Esbjerg hosted its first ever Sydbank Pokalen final in 2020.  Odense Stadium hosted the 1991 final while the 1992 final was played at Aarhus Idrætspark.

Route to the final

Note: In all results below, the score of the finalist is given first (H: home; A: away).

Effects of COVID-19

In addition to the scheduling changes caused by the national COVID-19 shutdown, the final match was delayed for 14 minutes in the first half due to a group of fans not adhering to social distancing guidelines.

The limited capacity crowd of 1,750 (10% of capacity) included an allotment of 725 tickets for each team's fan base, provided they sat 2 meters apart.  Just before the 30-minute mark of the first half, a group of Ultras from AaB had grouped together and refused to move, despite pleas from the club's coaches and other fans.  This group was subsequently ejected from the stadium and, after a 14-minute delay, the game resumed.

Match

Details
</onlyinclude>

References

Danish Cup Finals
Danish Cup Final

Danish Cup Final
Sports competitions in Denmark